While there are several high schools in the United States named for, after, or similar to Robert E. Lee, the athletic mascots of these schools vary. Below is a list of the schools and their mascots.

Robert E. Lee High Schools
 Robert E. Lee High School (Baytown, Texas) - Gander
 Robert E. Lee Academy (Bishopville, South Carolina) - Cavaliers
 Robert E. Lee High School (Fairfax County, Virginia) - Lancer
 Robert E. Lee High School (Houston, Texas) - Generals
 Robert E. Lee High School (Jacksonville, Florida) - Generals
 Robert E. Lee High School (Midland, Texas) - Rebels
 Robert E. Lee High School (Montgomery, Alabama) - Generals
 Robert E. Lee High School (San Antonio, Texas) - Volunteers
 Robert E. Lee High School (Staunton, Virginia) - The Fighting Leemen
 Robert E. Lee High School (Tyler, Texas) - Red Raiders

Robert Lee High Schools
 Robert Lee High School (Robert Lee, Texas) - Steers

Lee High Schools
 Lee High School (Houston, Texas), formerly named Robert E. Lee High School - Generals
 Lee High School (Huntsville, Alabama) - Generals
 Lee High School (Lee County, Virginia) - Generals
 Upson-Lee High School (Thomaston, Georgia), formerly Robert E. Lee High School - Knights
 Lee High School (Wyoming, Michigan) - Former Rebels, now Legends.

Lee County High Schools
 Lee County High School (Leesburg, Georgia) - Trojans

References

American mascots
High school mascots